Krasnoslobodsk is the name of several urban localities in Russia:
Krasnoslobodsk, Republic of Mordovia, a town in the Republic of Mordovia
Krasnoslobodsk, Volgograd Oblast, a town in Volgograd Oblast

See also
 Krasnoslobodsky (disambiguation)